The Al-Muttaqin Mosque is a mosque in Ang Mo Kio, Singapore. It is the fifth mosque completed in the country under the Mosque Building Fund Scheme Phase I. The mosque's official ground-breaking ceremony was officiated by Mr Syed Ali Redha Alsagoff, chairman of Lembaga Biasiswa Kenangan Maulud (LBKM), on 29 April 1979 and it was officially opened on 21 September 1980 by the late Mr Rahmat Kenap (MP for Geylang Serai). The chosen name Al-Muttaqin refers to the pious people who are ever aware of God the Almighty.

See also
Islam in Singapore
List of mosques in Singapore

References

External links 

1980 establishments in Singapore
Buildings and structures in Ang Mo Kio
Mosques completed in 1980
Muttaqin
20th-century architecture in Singapore